Shlomit C. Schuster (born 19 July 1951 in Paramaribo, Suriname and died 15 Feb 2016 in Israel) was an Israeli Philosophical Counselor, and considered a pioneer in the Philosophical counseling field. Her first book is considered a source of learning and teaching Philosophical counseling .

Schuster migrated to Israel in 1976 and started philosophy academic studies at the Hebrew University of Jerusalem.

She got to the philosophical practice field following  a newspaper article. She trained under the Dutch philosophical counselor Ad Hoogendijk, a colleague of Gerd B. Achenbach. In 1989 she opened the philosophical practice center in Israel, "Center Sophon" in Jerusalem. In 1990 she opened the philosophical First-Aid Line, "Philosophone", for persons with existential problems and ethical challenges. In 2000 she received her Ph.D. degree. Her thesis, conducted by Marcel-Jacques Dubois and Maurice S. Friedman, described the life of central philosophers in order to find ways to help people by their autobiography.

She was an Editorial board member of the Journal of Radical Psychology, the International Journal for Philosophical Practice, and Journal of Humanities Therapy 

Schuster died in Jerusalem on 15 February 2016, after a serious illness.

Books 
 Philosophy Practice: An Alternative to Counseling and Psychotherapy (1999), Translated to Dutch (2001), Italian (2006) and Chinese (2007). This book is considered as a source of learning and teaching philosophy practice.
 The Philosopher's Autobiography: A Qualitative Study (2003)

References

External links 
 The original site of Shlomit C. Schuster (Last update: July 2015)
 In her memory
 Memoir of National Philosophical Counseling Association
 Facebook Memoir: (in spanish)
 Philosophone, Philosophical First-Aid Line

1951 births
2016 deaths
Hebrew University of Jerusalem alumni
Israeli Jews
Israeli people of Surinamese-Jewish descent
Israeli philosophers
Jewish philosophers
Philosophical counselors
Surinamese emigrants to Israel
Surinamese Jews
People from Paramaribo